The 2021 NCAA Division I men's soccer championship game (also known as the 2021 NCAA Division I Men's College Cup) was played on December 12, 2021, at WakeMed Soccer Park in Cary, North Carolina and determined the winner of the 2021 NCAA Division I Men's Soccer Tournament, the national collegiate soccer championship in the United States. This was the 63rd edition of the oldest active competition in United States college soccer.

The tournament returned to its traditional mid-December date after being held in the spring the previous year due to the COVID-19 pandemic.

The match featured Clemson University of the Atlantic Coast Conference (ACC) and the University of Washington of the Pac-12 Conference. It was Clemson's fifth appearance in the final, and their first since 2015. Washington was making their first appearance in the national championship game.

Clemson went on to win the match to win, 2–0, behind two first half goals from Isaiah Reid. The title gave Clemson their first NCAA title in men's soccer since 1987, and their third overall title.

Road to the final 

The NCAA Division I Men's Soccer Tournament, sometimes known as the College Cup, is an American intercollegiate soccer tournament conducted by the National Collegiate Athletic Association (NCAA), and determines the Division I men's national champion. The tournament has been formally held since 1959, when it was an eight-team tournament. Since then, the tournament has expanded to 48 teams, in which every Division I conference tournament champion is allocated a berth. It was Clemson's fifth appearance in the final, and their first since 2015. Washington was making their first appearance in the national championship game. Clemson had previously won the NCAA Tournament in 1984 and 1987.

Match details

References 

Championship Game
NCAA Division I Men's Soccer Championship Games
2021 in sports in North Carolina
December 2021 sports events in the United States
Clemson Tigers men's soccer
Washington Huskies men's soccer